Judea is a suburb of Tauranga in the Bay of Plenty region of New Zealand's North Island. It is located on State Highway 2, east of Bethlehem.

The suburb was established as a European fortified settlement in 1864, as part of an offensive against local Māori during the New Zealand Wars. India Rebout, later as the Judea Redoubt and Huria Redoubt, was one of three fortified European forts in Tauranga.

The local Huria Marae and Tamatea Pokaiwhenua meeting house is a tribal meeting place of the Ngāti Ranginui hapū of Ngāi Tamarawaho.

Demographics

Judea had a population of 4,467 at the 2018 New Zealand census, an increase of 459 people (11.5%) since the 2013 census, and an increase of 615 people (16.0%) since the 2006 census. There were 1,635 households, comprising 2,085 males and 2,382 females, giving a sex ratio of 0.88 males per female, with 912 people (20.4%) aged under 15 years, 870 (19.5%) aged 15 to 29, 1,935 (43.3%) aged 30 to 64, and 753 (16.9%) aged 65 or older.

Ethnicities were 78.0% European/Pākehā, 23.9% Māori, 3.2% Pacific peoples, 7.8% Asian, and 2.3% other ethnicities. People may identify with more than one ethnicity.

The percentage of people born overseas was 17.7, compared with 27.1% nationally.

Although some people chose not to answer the census's question about religious affiliation, 50.9% had no religion, 34.2% were Christian, 2.2% had Māori religious beliefs, 0.8% were Hindu, 0.3% were Muslim, 0.5% were Buddhist and 3.1% had other religions.

Of those at least 15 years old, 591 (16.6%) people had a bachelor's or higher degree, and 690 (19.4%) people had no formal qualifications. 390 people (11.0%) earned over $70,000 compared to 17.2% nationally. The employment status of those at least 15 was that 1,692 (47.6%) people were employed full-time, 540 (15.2%) were part-time, and 153 (4.3%) were unemployed.

References

Suburbs of Tauranga
Populated places around the Tauranga Harbour